Norrie Woodhall (née Bugler, 18 December 1905 – 25 October 2011) was an English actress who was the last surviving member of the Hardy Players, an amateur theatrical group based in Dorchester, Dorset, that formed in 1908 to perform dramatisations of the works of novelist Thomas Hardy. Norrie joined the Hardy Players when she was 16, and acted in two plays. In 1924, when her older sister, Gertrude Bugler, played the title role in Tess of the D’Urbervilles, young Norrie played Tess’s younger sister, Liza-Lu. As she later recounted, Liza-Lu was a non-speaking part, so Hardy wrote a line for her to say in the play. The Hardy Players disbanded in 1928, shortly after Hardy's death.

The Hardy Players reformed in 2005, at Norrie’s request and she returned to the stage at the age of 100.

In 2010, it was revealed that a collection of Hardy’s original manuscripts were to be sold at a charity auction. Woodhall and the New Hardy Players, supported by institutions such as the University of Exeter and Dorset County Museum, launched a campaign to raise £58,000 to buy the collection. The campaign was successful and the papers are now in the Dorset County Museum.

Woodhall lived to enjoy performances of several of Hardy’s novels by the New Hardy Players, and is fondly remembered by her fellow cast members for her dramatic rendition of Hardy’s poem The Ruined Maid. She died in 2011, at the age of 105.

References

External links

1905 births
2011 deaths
English stage actresses
English centenarians
Women centenarians